Hauffenia kerschneri is a species of minute freshwater snails with an operculum, aquatic gastropod molluscs or micromolluscs in the family Hydrobiidae. This species is endemic to Austria.

References

 

Hauffenia
Hydrobiidae
Endemic fauna of Austria
Gastropods described in 1930
Taxonomy articles created by Polbot